Waikiki (also known as Waikiki Beach) is a neighborhood of Honolulu on the south shore of the island of Oahu in the U.S. state of Hawaii.

Waikiki is most famous for Waikiki Beach, which is one of six beaches in the district, along with Queen's Beach, Kuhio Beach, Gray's Beach, Fort DeRussy Beach and Kahanamoku Beach. Waikiki Beach is almost entirely man-made.

There are beaches called Waikiki in other parts of the world, such as Tarragona (Spain), Western Australia (Australia), or Lima (Peru).

Waikiki (Hawaii) is home to public places including Kapiolani Park, Fort DeRussy, Kahanamoku Lagoon, Kūhiō Beach Park and Ala Wai Harbor. Waikiki was the first capital of the Kingdom of Hawaii from 1795 to 1796.

Etymology
The Hawaiian language name  means spouting fresh water, for springs and streams that fed wetlands that once separated Waikiki from the interior.

History

The area was a retreat for Hawaiian royalty in the 1800s who enjoyed surfing there on early forms of longboards. A few small hotels opened in the 1880s. In 1893, Greek-American George Lycurgus leased the guest house of Allen Herbert and renamed it the "Sans Souci" (French for "without worries" or “carefree”) creating one of the first beach resorts. Later that year Robert Louis Stevenson stayed at the resort; subsequently it became a popular destination for mainland tourists. The area at coordinates  is still called "Sans Souci Beach".

Waikiki has had erosion problems since the late 1800s, because hotels and homes were built too close to the natural shoreline, while seawalls and other structures blocked the natural ebb and flow of sand along the beach. 

In the early 1900s, Waikiki was home to many wetlands, which were claimed to harbor disease-carrying mosquitoes. To get rid of the mosquitoes, developers created the Ala Wai canal. The canal, originally known as the Waikiki Drainage Canal, was created by a Hawaiian dredging company run by Walter F. Dillingham. The project took about seven years, 1921–1928.

In the early 20th century, Duke Kahanamoku became a well-known surfer in Waikiki. Throughout his life and after competing in the Olympics, many people around the world wanted to learn to surf. Duke's influence made Waikiki beach a surfing hotspot. "Dukes", a club in Waikiki named for Kahanamoku, helped Don Ho produce music and hosted the longest-running show in Waikiki.

Seawalls and groins began to appear. These helped build sand at one beach, but typically appropriated sand from others. Before 1950, Waikiki beaches were continuous. They became separated into sections, some with sandy beach and others without. By 1950, more than 80 structures, including seawalls, groins, piers and storm drains, occupied the Waikiki shoreline.

In the 1920s and 1930s sand was imported from Manhattan Beach, California, via ship and barge.

Following World War II, Waikiki beach restoration efforts have occurred every few years. Sand was imported to this artificial beach from the 1920s to the 1970s, once by boat and barge from Southern California.  of shoreline was replenished at a cost of $2.4 million following chronic erosion of more than a foot a year.

The first high-rise hotels on Waikiki were built in 1955, including the Waikiki Biltmore and Sheraton Princess Kaiulani Hotel. Development boomed due to demand, and the area became filled with large resort hotels, such as the Hilton Hawaiian Village, Halekulani, the Hyatt Regency Waikiki, Marriott Waikiki, Sheraton Waikiki. These complemented historic hotels dating back to the early 20th century such as the Moana Surfrider Hotel and the Royal Hawaiian Hotel.

Importing stopped in the 1970s. In March 1971, the Corps of Engineers Pacific Ocean Division, created a Draft Environmental Statement for the Kuhio Beach Sector of Waikiki, which aimed to improve the overall quality and size of the fading and narrowing shoreline.

From October 29 through November 4, 2000, the first FINA World Open Water Swimming Championships were held in the waters off Waikiki Beach.

A partial restoration was completed in the spring of 2012. The project temporarily restored the beach to its 1985 shoreline. Two aging sandbag groin structures were also removed that year.

In 2017, beach erosion worsened with high-energy king tides and elevated sea levels. Honolulu's mayor stated: "I'm not a scientist, but I'll get a jackhammer in there and remove all the concrete that's there creating this backwash and sucking out more sand, plus it's just downright dangerous."

The beach hosts many events, including surf competitions, outdoor performances, hula dancing and outrigger canoe races. The many amenities, shops, and hotels enable Waikiki to generate approximately 42 percent of Hawaiʻi's visitor revenue.

Geography 
The neighborhood extends from the Ala Wai Canal (a channel dug to drain one-time wetlands) on the west and north, to Diamond Head (Lēahi, tuna brow) on the east. Waikiki Beach is noted for its views of the Diamond Head tuff cone, its usually warm and cloud-free climate and its surf break.

The Waikiki skyline is filled with high-rises and resort hotels. Half of the beach is marked off for surfers. For some distance into the ocean the water is quite shallow, with numerous rocks on the bottom. The waves can have some force, particularly on windy days. The surf is known for its long rolling break, making it ideal for long boarding, tandem surfing and beginners.

Beaches 
Largely as a result of shoreline development, Waikiki has eight distinct beaches. They are Ft. DeRussy Beach, Duke Kahanamoku, Halekulani, Royal Hawaiian, Kūhiō Beach, Kapiolani Beach, Queens Beach and Kaimana. Today, however, it is believed that very little of the added sand remains. From the beach the sunset in the sea is visible from mid-September to late March.

Ala Moana Beach Park, Hawaii's single most popular beach, is adjacent to but not technically part of Waikiki, and was similarly artificially made.

Thoroughfares 
Waikiki's main thoroughfare is Kalākaua Avenue, named after King Kalākaua, which houses most of the high-end hotels (Royal Hawaiian, Sheraton, Hyatt, Moana Surfrider Hotel), most of the luxury designer brand stores (Apple Store, Chanel, Louis Vuitton, Prada, Burberry, Dior, Tiffany & Co., Fendi, Cartier, Gucci, and Coach) and popular surf clothing brand stores (Quiksilver, Billabong, Volcom). Waikiki's other main thoroughfare, Kūhiō Avenue, named after Prince Kūhiō, is better known for its restaurants, cafes and grocers, along with its clubs, nightlife and prostitution.

Public art 
In 1990, the  bronze statue of Duke Kahanamoku by Gordon Fisher was installed at Waikiki Beach, accompanied by a bronze replica of his surfboard, honorary spears, and commemorative bronze plaques.  It serves as a culture and tourist locale with thousands of annual visitors and numerous cultural events. Seven years later, Billy Fields created The Stones of Life   (in Hawaiian: Nā Pōhaku Ola O Kapaemahu A Me Kapuni), a sculpture incorporating ancient basaltic stones, was installed nearby and is considered a local monument.

At Kūhiō Beach and Queens Beach, three public artworks were installed in the early 2000s.  The bronze statue of Prince Jonah Kuhio by Sean Browne and the children's story sculpture Makua and Kila by Holly Young were installed in 2001.  Robert Pashby's Surfer on a Wave was installed at Queens Beach in 2003.

Beach problems

Erosion

Waikiki beach has had repeated problems with erosion, leading to the construction of groins and beach replenishment projects. Imported sand came from California and from local beaches such as Pāpōhaku Beach on Moloka‘i, and a sandbar from Oʻahu's Northern side near Kahuku. Officials look for ways to sustain the existing sand by eliminating loss due to tidal flow.

Water quality
Waikiki Beach had repeated contamination problems due to sewage spills in 2017.

Homelessness
Many homeless people settle around the beach because of the public shower and sanitary facilities available there.
The Honolulu Police Department has increased patrolling in and around Waikiki Beach with assistance from other city agencies and local businesses to prevent homeless people from making camp in this area.

Education
Hawaii state Department of Education operates conventional public schools throughout Hawaii. Thomas Jefferson Elementary School is located in Waikiki proper, while Waikiki Elementary School is located nearby, at the makai (seaward) edge of the Kapahulu neighborhood.

The Hawaii State Public Library System operates the Waikiki Public Library.

Twin towns – sister cities
Waikiki is twinned with:
  Freshwater, New South Wales, Australia
   Bixby, Oklahoma, United States
  Rotorua, New Zealand

In popular culture
The Kinks satirized the commercial aspects of Waikiki's mass tourism in their song "Holiday in Waikiki" from their 1966 album Face to Face.

Lizzy Grant song “Wayamaya”.

Gallery

See also

List of leading shopping streets and districts by city
Save Our Surf
Waikiki Trolley

Notes

References

External links

 Waikiki - Hawaii Tourism Authority

 
Neighborhoods in Honolulu